Fatal accidents to competitors at the Autodromo Nazionale di Monza, Italy  during the Italian Grand Prix and other national and international  motor-sport events.

List of fatal accidents involving competitors

List of fatal accidents during unofficial testing

List of fatal accidents involving race officials

List of fatal accidents involving spectators

Sources

See also
Driver deaths in motorsport

Monza
Monza